German submarine U-647 was a Type VIIC U-boat of Nazi Germany's Kriegsmarine during World War II. The submarine was laid down on 29 December 1941 at the Blohm & Voss yard at Hamburg, launched on 16 September 1942, and commissioned on 5 November 1942 under the command of Kapitänleutnant Willi Hertin.

Attached to 5th U-boat Flotilla based at Kiel, U-647 completed her training period on 31 May 1943 and was assigned to front-line service.

Design
German Type VIIC submarines were preceded by the shorter Type VIIB submarines. U-647 had a displacement of  when at the surface and  while submerged. She had two shafts and two  propellers.

U-647 was fitted with five  torpedo tubes (four fitted at the bow and one at the stern), fourteen torpedoes, one  SK C/35 naval gun, 220 rounds, and one twin  C/30 anti-aircraft gun. The boat had a complement of between forty-four and sixty.

Service history
On the first and only war patrol U-647 was last heard of on 28 July 1943 and declared missing on 3 August 1943.

She was identified in 1977 on the seabed in the vicinity of the Frigg gas field. It likely struck a mine and sunk. No torpedoes were on board, and it was decided to take no action.

References

Bibliography

External links

German Type VIIC submarines
1942 ships
Ships built in Hamburg
U-boats commissioned in 1942
U-boats sunk in 1943
U-boats sunk by unknown causes
World War II shipwrecks in the North Sea
Missing U-boats of World War II
World War II submarines of Germany
Maritime incidents in July 1943